Emeka Ezeugo (born 16 December 1965) is a Nigerian former professional footballer who played as a midfielder. He debuted as a professional footballer for Indian club East Bengal FC, has also represented the Nigeria national team in the FIFA World Cup. He last managed Abia Warriors FC as a football coach.

Club career
Ezeugo was born in Aba. He played professionally for clubs in five different continents during a 15-year playing career after starting his career at East Bengal.

He started for another Bangladeshi club, Mohammedan, towards the end of the 1980s. He later moved to the Danish League with middle of the table club Lyngby BK and prospered so much that he made it to the Nigerian national team for the 1994 FIFA World Cup. He came to India for a short spell in 1997 to play a few matches for Mohun Bagan AC.

International career
Ezeugo first played for the Nigeria national team at the 1988 Summer Olympics in Seoul, South Korea. Nicknamed "Emmy", he obtained 11 caps for the national team between 1992 and 1994, and was a member of the team that competed at the 1994 FIFA World Cup.

Coaching career
Ezeugo holds a US Soccer Federation coaching license and a KNVB Netherlands international license.  Ezeugo has an envious coaching record over the past seven years, as he successfully completed his transition from player to coach that included a stint as the head coach at CoT NYs Borough of Manhattan Community College in 2002. In 2003 coached the Deportivo Municipal, Lima for two seasons before coming back to the United States, on 15 August 2005 was named as the new men's soccer coach at New York City College of Technology, here was between 2008.

Ezeuga spent summers 2004 to 2006 coaching at Camp Chateaugay, a summer camp located in New York's Adirondack Mountains for kids ages 7 to 15.

On 19 April 2008, he returned to India and signed a contract as head coach by his former club Churchill Brothers SC on 5 September 2008 was released from his contract.

He was then the chief coach of Heartland, a position he assumed less than a month ago.

On 31 October 2013, he was named the head coach of the newly promoted Nigeria Premier League team Abia Warriors.

Personal life
Emeka's brother Valentine Ezuego, a former footballer in India, recommended the former Nigerian World Cupper to Churchill Bros patron Churchill Alemao.

Conversion
In February 2012, while he was coach of Mohammedan Sporting Club of Bangladesh, he converted to Islam.

Honours

Individual
Nehru Centenary Club Cup – Taj Bengal Trophy for player of the tournament: 1990

References

External links

 Aalborg BK Oldtimers profile (in Danish)

1965 births
Living people
People from Aba, Abia
Nigerian Muslims
Nigerian footballers
Association football midfielders
Nigeria international footballers
1992 African Cup of Nations players
1994 FIFA World Cup players
Olympic footballers of Nigeria
Footballers at the 1988 Summer Olympics
Danish Superliga players
Nemzeti Bajnokság I players
East Bengal Club players
Rangers International F.C. players
Sri Pahang FC players
Lyngby Boldklub players
Boldklubben Frem players
AaB Fodbold players
Budapest Honvéd FC players
Fremad Amager players
Deportivo Fabril players
Mohammedan SC (Dhaka) players
Mohun Bagan AC players
Churchill Brothers FC Goa players
Hershey Wildcats players
Porthmadog F.C. players
Nigerian football managers
Abia Warriors F.C. managers
Nigerian expatriate footballers
Nigerian expatriate sportspeople in India
Expatriate footballers in India
Nigerian expatriate sportspeople in Bangladesh
Expatriate footballers in Bangladesh
Nigerian expatriate sportspeople in Malaysia
Expatriate footballers in Malaysia
Nigerian expatriate sportspeople in Denmark
Expatriate men's footballers in Denmark
Nigerian expatriate sportspeople in Hungary
Expatriate footballers in Hungary
Nigerian expatriate sportspeople in Spain
Expatriate footballers in Spain
Nigerian expatriate sportspeople in the United States
Expatriate soccer players in the United States
Nigerian expatriate sportspeople in Wales
Expatriate footballers in Wales
Expatriate footballers in Peru
Converts to Islam
Deportivo Municipal managers